Chuttalabbai is a 2016 Telugu-language action comedy drama film. The film was directed and written by Veerabhadram Chowdary, and produced by S.R.T Entertainments.

Plot
Recovery Agent Babji came across a girl, named Kavya and helped her. He discovered that she was in danger from her family. Babji saves her. Unfortunately, Kavya's brother misunderstood that Babji was behind this and starts chasing the couple.

Babji takes Kavya with him to his village and introduces her as his best friend. As time passes Kavya and Babji fall in love with each other, but at the end, both Kavya's family and another gang attack Babji and his family. The rest of the story shows how Babji handles the issue, solves his problems and eventually marries Kavya.

Cast

 Aadi as Recovery Agent Babji
 Namitha Pramod as Kavya
 Sai Kumar as Dorababu, Babji's father
 Abhimanyu Singh as ACP Gautam Krishna
 John Kokken as Antagonist
 Prudhviraj as E. Govardhan Reddy "Mr. Ego"
 Ali as Kidnap Krish
 Posani Krishna Murali as Varada Raju
 Anitha Nath as Varada Raju's wife
 Malavika Avinash as Dorababu's wife, Babji's mother
 Yamini Malhotra as Chilaka
 Himaja as Himaja
 Charandeep as Police Officer
 Neelya Bhavani as Mr. Ego's keep
 Annapoorna as Babji's grandmother
 Vamsi Krishna as Police Officer, Gautam Krishna's colleague
 Raghu Babu

Soundtrack

The music was composed by S. Thaman, and released by Lahari Music.

Critical reception

References

External links 
 

2016 masala films
Films scored by Thaman S
Indian action comedy-drama films
2010s Telugu-language films
2016 action films